Skell refers to a person who is homeless, vagrant or derelict. It is often used to connote such a person who is habitually engaged in small-time criminal activity, especially by one working as a con artist or panhandler.

History
In its modern form, the use of skell as a slang term in the United States appears to date from the 1960s, most especially from New York City. The word has sometimes been used by the police officer characters on the TV shows NYPD Blue, Third Watch, Gotham,  Law and Order: SVU, and Blue Bloods. The term has been used so often on these programs that it has essentially come to mean any sort of criminal or perp, which itself has come to mean anyone accused of a crime. 
It also appears in the 1964 novel Last Exit to Brooklyn by American author Hubert Selby, Jr.

Origin
Possible origins for the word include:
The 17th century English slang word , a noun and verb which referred to a professional beggar, especially one who falsely pretended to be a wounded former soldier to gain sympathy; more generally, it could be used for a swindler or cheat. An early recorded use is by Ben Jonson, from his play Poetaster, written in 1601: 'An honest decayed commander, cannot , cheat, nor be  in a  house.' In an older military connection, the term  seems to have been used in early Medieval England to mean 'shield-maker' (Old Norse ?), the supposed derivation of the street name Skeldergate in the city of York.
 The Dutch , a word meaning 'villain' or 'rogue'.
 The Latin , meaning 'wicked deed' or 'wickedness'.

Use in film, television and music

The term is used several times in the film Miller's Crossing, especially in regard to the character Bernie Bernbaum.

Crow T. Robot refers to Michael J. Nelson as a skell in a sketch performed in episode 905 of Mystery Science Theater 3000.

Ed Burns (Mickey) refers to Mike McGlone (Francis) as a skell in the movie She's the One.

Joe Pesci (Nicky Santoro) uses the term skell in his rant to Robert De Niro (Sam Rothstein) in the movie Casino.

Police Officer Smitty refers to Bender as a skell when he and his partner, URL, are undercover in Little Bitaly in the second-season episode of Futurama entitled Bender Gets Made.

Within the Law & Order extended universe, the term has been casually used by leading characters such as Det. Lennie Briscoe, Lt. Anita Van Buren, Det. Elliot Stabler and Det. Mike Logan.

In the Third Watch television series, the term has been frequently used in casual conversation between the leading NYPD characters such as John "Sully" Sullivan, Maurice "Bosco" Boscorelli and others.

Starting in Season 2 (Rise of the Villains) of Gotham, Michael Chiklis (Captain Nathanial Barnes) often refers to miscellaneous but expectedly nefarious characters as "skells." He typically does so with a "shoot 'em if you need to" tone, alluding to the worthless nature of their character, both literally and figuratively.

The term is mentioned in Type O Negative song "Der Untermensch", in the line "Skells like you allowed to live/ Get off society's back".

The term is used frequently in the Public Morals television series written by Ed Burns  and set in 1960s New York City.

While cleaning up after a vagrant's vomit due to hallucinations and visions, a police officer in Max Payne 2 said about aforementioned vagrant, "I've been cleaning up after this skell all night".

In 'True Confessions' the fourth episode of the NYPD Blue first season, Robert Breuler (Detective Walker) and his partner Dennis Franz (Detective Sipowicz) use the term several times when referring to a nervous Ethan Phillips (Dwight).

In "Magic Man", the first episode of the fifth season of Better Call Saul, Bob Odenkirk (Jimmy McGill) uses the term when referring to his potential clients.

In Breaking Bad, Season 5 Episode 5, "Dead Freight", Mike Ermantraut says to round up some skels.

References

External links

skell defined in World Wide Words

Stereotypes
English-language slang
Social class subcultures